Adam Maher (born 14 November 1981) is an Australian cricketer. He played 21 first-class matches for Tasmania between 2009 and 2013.

See also
 List of Tasmanian representative cricketers

References

External links
 

1981 births
Living people
Australian cricketers
Tasmania cricketers
Cricketers from Newcastle, New South Wales
Australian cricket coaches